These are the official results of the Women's 1,500m metres event at the 1984 Summer Olympics in Los Angeles, California, United States. The final was held on August 11, 1984.

Medalists

Abbreviations

Final

Heats
Held in 1984-08-09

See also
 1980 Women's Olympic 1,500 metres (Moscow)
 1982 Women's European Championships 1,500 metres (Athens)
 1983 Women's World Championships 1,500 metres (Helsinki)
 1984 Women's Friendship Games 1,500 metres (Prague)
 1986 Women's European Championships 1,500 metres (Stuttgart)
 1987 Women's World Championships 1,500 metres (Rome)
 1988 Women's Olympic 1,500 metres (Seoul)

References

External links
 Official Report
 Results
 Results

 
1500 metres at the Olympics
1984 in women's athletics
Women's events at the 1984 Summer Olympics